Tarlair Swimming Pool is a disused lido at the base of a sea cliff just outside Macduff in Aberdeenshire in Scotland. This outdoor swimming complex was built in an Art Deco style with a main building backing onto the cliffs and changing rooms to its left hand side. It is considered by Historic Environment Scotland to be the best example of only three surviving outdoor seaside pools in Scotland, the others being at Stonehaven and Gourock.

The design of the pool was a clever use of pumped sea water to fill the pools, and flooding of the main pool at high tide to flush out the old water. The main pool had a diving board at the deep end and a child's chute at the shallow end, though both are now missing. The second-largest pool was a boating pool with the two remaining pools being paddling pools.

The complex is now in some disrepair with a mixture of weathering, rock falls and vandalism being the main causes.

Channel 4 television made "Tarlair Outdoor Pool" the subject of the third episode of a series of six documentary films on "Britain's Abandoned Playgrounds". The site also features in the Stuart MacBride novel, "The Missing and the Dead", when a child's body is found in the pool.

History 

The pool was commissioned by Macduff Burgh Council in 1929, with the architect being John C Miller, the Burgh Surveyor of MacDuff. The contractor for the project was Robert Morrison & Son of Macduff. The pool operated from 1931 until the mid-1990s.

Between 1985 and 1994 Tarlair Swimming Pool was used as an open air concert arena where bands like Jethro Tull, Runrig and Wet Wet Wet played.

Since 2007 it has been protected as a category A listed building.

In 2010, a proposal was put forward for redevelopment of the complex as a lobster hatchery. The plans were never realised.

A "Friends of Tarlair" group was formed in 2012. There were proposals from Aberdeenshire Council to fill some or all of the pool, but this was thrown out in January 2013. Later that year, councillors agreed to contribute £300,000 towards refurbishing the pool. In 2020 the Friends of Tarlair organisation had a formal application to Aberdeenshire Council to have ownership of Tarlair Swimming Pool transferred over to the group accepted.

References

External links 

 The Mecca of the Moray Firth: How the tide turned on Tarlair Outdoor Swimming Pool, article in The Press and Journal
 TARLAIR SWIMMING POOL INCLUDING BOATING POOL, PADDLING POOL, TEA PAVILION, CHANGING ROOMS, KIOSKS AND FENCE (LB50788), Historic Scotland entry
 Friends of Tarlair
 Tidal salt-water open air swimming pools, archived web page
 Tarlair, Macduff, Scotland, a photo from the 1890s
 POLICY AND RESOURCES COMMITTEE – 13 JUNE 2013 TARLAIR SWIMMING POOL COMPLEX MACDUFF
 Tarlair Swimming Pool Complex - Business Plan - Revision 10th October 2019

Swimming venues in Scotland
Art Deco architecture in Scotland
Buildings and structures in Aberdeenshire
Sports venues in Aberdeenshire
Category A listed buildings in Aberdeenshire
Macduff, Aberdeenshire